Kettlebelly or Kettle Belly may refer to:

 Gregory "Kettle Belly" Baldwin, a fictional character used by Robert Heinlein in some of his stories, including Gulf
Kettle Belly, a character in the 1931 western Two Gun Man
'Kettle Belly' Simpson,  a character in the 1927 film Somewhere in Sonora

See also
Kettlebell, a cast iron or cast steel ball with a handle attached to the top
Potbelly (disambiguation)